Gwynfryn ('Gwyn') Evans is a former Welsh international lawn bowls player.

Personal life
Evans was born in Gelli, Rhondda. His father Clifford Maldwyn Evans won the Welsh Pairs Championship in 1952 with his brother (Gwyn's uncle) John Morgan Evans (1917-1985), a world-class player. Gwyn worked as a chartered public finance accountant and chief executive of Rhondda Borough Council until his retirement.

His brother was Maldwyn Evans, the 1972 World Outdoor Bowls Championship gold medal winner.

Bowls career
He won a bronze medal in the men's fours at the 1978 Commonwealth Games in Edmonton with Ellis Stanbury, Ian Sutherland and John Thomson.

He represented Wales from 1967 until 1985, won the Welsh indoor singles title in 1978, and captained the Welsh team in the 1980 World Outdoor Bowls Championship in Melbourne.

He won two National Championship Pairs titles in 1966 and 1967, with his brother Maldwyn and one fours title in 1961.

References

Welsh male bowls players
Commonwealth Games bronze medallists for Wales
Bowls players at the 1978 Commonwealth Games
Commonwealth Games medallists in lawn bowls
1931 births
People from Rhondda
Living people
Medallists at the 1978 Commonwealth Games